Gráinne Kierans (born 20 September 1978) is an Irish football coach and former player who was the head coach of Shamrock Rovers team who play in the Women's National League (Ireland). Kierans, the holder of a UEFA A licence, played as a midfielder or striker for several English clubs and represented the Republic of Ireland national team.

Club career
As a 20-year-old, Kierans spent a summer playing semi-professionally in Denmark. From here she was signed by Arsenal, before moving on to Charlton Athletic two years later. At Arsenal she had been one of seven Irish players then at the club, including her former St Patrick's Athletic L.F.C. teammates Emma Byrne and Ciara Grant. Kierans quit Charlton in 2003 then had single season spells with Leeds United, Doncaster Rovers Belles and Bristol Academy.

Kierans returned to Ireland in 2006 through work, then played for Drogheda United and St. Francis. She won the FAI Women's Cup with St. Francis in 2008 then retired in 2009 after playing in the 2009–10 UEFA Women's Champions League qualifying round.

International career
Kierans represented the Republic of Ireland in the 1999 FIFA Women's World Cup qualification (UEFA) tournament while attached to St. Patrick's Athletic. She went on to captain the side and was still a member of the squad after returning from her club career in England.

Personal life
After returning to Ireland Kierans ran a gym in Ballyjamesduff.

See also

 Gráinne (given name)

References

External links
FIFA profile

Living people
1978 births
People from Drogheda
Association footballers from County Louth
Republic of Ireland women's association footballers
Arsenal W.F.C. players
Doncaster Rovers Belles L.F.C. players
Leeds United Women F.C. players
Bristol Academy W.F.C. players
Charlton Athletic W.F.C. players
Republic of Ireland women's international footballers
FA Women's National League players
Expatriate footballers in England
St Francis L.F.C. players
Dublin Women's Soccer League players
Women's association football forwards